Annibale de Gasparis (9 November 1819 – 21 March 1892) was an Italian astronomer, known for discovering asteroids and his contributions to theoretical astronomy.

Biography
De Gasparis was born in 1819 in Bugnara to Angelo de Gasparis and Eleonora Angelantoni  originally from Tocco da Casauria. Son of a doctor, he studied in the seminars of Sulmona and Chieti, becoming passionate of classic novels and learning mathematics as a self-taught person. In 1838 he arrived in Naples to study engineering at the School of Bridges and Roads, today's Engineering faculty of Naples University, and the following year he was accepted as a student at the Astronomical Observatory of Capodimonte by the director Ernesto Capocci. He studied mathematics and celestial mechanics and in 1845 he published his first scientific paper on the orbit of the minor planet Vesta. For this studies he earned, as early as 1846, the honorary degree in mathematics by the University of Naples.

In 1848 he participated in the liberal movements, he avoided the Bourbon repression dedicating to the King Ferdinand II his first discovery: the asteroid Hygiea, made on 12 April 1849 with the equatorial telescope of Reichenbach & Utzschneider, giving it the name of Igea Borbonica. In 1850, Capocci was dismissed as director of the observatory due to his participation in the liberal revolts. De Gasparis refused to assume the position of observatory director in deference to his mentor and friend Capocci.

In 1858 he was appointed professor of astronomy in Naples University.

After the death of Capocci, 6 January 1864, he was appointed as director of the Astronomical Observatory of Capodimonte in Naples. Due to his illness he left the observatory in 1889 going to live in a country house not far from the Observatory.

De Gasparis married Giuseppina Russo in 1848, and they had 9 children together, 3 of which died in infancy.

De Gasparis published more than 200 scientific papers on mathematics, celestial mechanics, astronomy and meteorology.

He and others occasionally wrote his name as Annibal de Gasparis.

Discoveries 
Annibale de Gasparis discovered visually the following nine asteroids. In addition, he also independently discovered 14 Irene, which discovery was, however, credited to the English astronomer John Russell Hind.

Honors and awards
He won the Gold Medal of the Royal Astronomical Society in 1851. He was also awarded the Lalande Prize from 1849 to 1853.

On 20 January 1861 he was appointed Senator of the Kingdom of Italy for his high scientific merits.

Recipient of the Order of the Red Eagle, and of the Order of the Rose.

The main-belt asteroid 4279 De Gasparis as well as the 30-kilometer lunar crater de Gasparis and the nearby 93-kilometer long fracture Rimae de Gasparis, are named in his honour.

References

External links
 , Bibliographic Code: 1851MmRAS..20..226A

1819 births
1892 deaths
Discoverers of asteroids

19th-century Italian astronomers
Recipients of the Gold Medal of the Royal Astronomical Society
Recipients of the Lalande Prize
Recipients of the Order of the Crown (Italy)
Scientists from Naples